Nikki Cleary is a self-titled album by Nikki Cleary released in 2003.

The song "Summertime Guys" was featured in the episode "The Golden Years" of Kim Possible in 2003, and was a track on the Kim Possible soundtrack.  It was also featured in the film Aquamarine.

The song "1-2-3" was featured in the film Confessions of a Teenage Drama Queen, the Lizzie McGuire: Total Party! album and on the second volume of the 2003 Nickelodeon Kids Choice Awards promotional albums.

Track listing

References 

Nikki Cleary albums
2003 albums
Jive Records albums